Anna Waser (16 October 1678 – 20 September 1714) was a Swiss painter.

Life
Anna Waser was born in 1678, the fifth child of a wealthy and respected family in Zurich. 

According to Jean-Baptiste Descamps she was born in Zurich in 1679 and became a pupil of Joseph Werner. According to the RKD she was born a year earlier and was an engraver and miniature painter.

Her parents were Esther Müller and the bailiff Johann Rudolf Waser, an educated man who promoted the talent of his daughter. He had her trained as a painter, despite all social conventions. When she could not learn anything on her first teacher Johannes Sulzer, she went at fourteen to Bern to study with Joseph Werner, one of the leading Swiss painter. Four years she remained as the only girl among his male students, in his "learning workshop for painting". Then she returned to her family to Zurich. There they received portrait commissions from the large circle. Also outside the city people became aware of the young painter. 
In 1699, Anna Waser now 21 years old, was appointed by the art-loving Count Wilhelm Moritz von Solms-Braunfels as court painter to his castle Braunfels an der Lahn in Hessen. 

Instead of a planned trip to Paris, she was asked back to Zurich, because the mother was ill and her brother Johann Rudolf, a tutor in Braunfels, decided to travel as a military chaplain to Holland. 
From about 1702, she now had to look after the home of her parents, and her painting suffered. She painted only here and there a portrait or a little pastoral scenes, for which she had at that time been famous. 
In 1708, she was together with her sisters Anna and Maria Elisabeth Waser continued some drawings. 
They finally sent her autobiography, a program executed in silver point technique Self-portrait and other works of art to Jacob von Sandrart for a scheduled update of his art lexicon Teutsche Academie.  In 1714 Anna Waser died at the age of 35 years as the consequences of a fall.

Legacy 
In 1998 Anna Waser's work was honoured by the Gesellschaft zu Fraumünster.

References

Sources
Gottfried Sello: Malerinnen aus fünf Jahrhunderten. Ellert und Richter, Hamburg 1988, .
Maria Waser: Die Geschichte der Anna Waser - Ein Roman aus der Wende des 17. Jahrhunderts. Deutsche Verlags-Anstalt, Stuttgart 1913 (Digitalisat der Auflage 1922); Neuauflage: Classen, Zürich 1978, 
Clara Erskine Clement Waters, Women in the Fine Arts, 1904, pp. 355-356

External links

 
 
 
Anna Waser on Artnet

1678 births
1714 deaths
17th-century Swiss painters
18th-century Swiss painters
Artists from Zürich
18th-century Swiss women artists
17th-century women artists
Accidental deaths from falls
Accidental deaths in Switzerland
17th-century Swiss women
17th-century Swiss artists
Swiss women painters